Beren is a Turkish female given name meaning "strong, clever, well-known".

People
Notable people with this name include:
 Beren Saat, Turkish actress.

References 

Turkish feminine given names